Brunk (in older sources also Brunik) is a small settlement in the Municipality of Radeče in southeastern Slovenia. The area is part of the historical region of Lower Carniola. The municipality is now included in the Lower Sava Statistical Region; until January 2014 it was part of the Savinja Statistical Region. 

The local church is dedicated to the Hoy Magi and belongs to the Parish of Radeče. It dates to around 1520.

References

External links
Brunk at Geopedia

Populated places in the Municipality of Radeče